Scotura annulata is a moth of the family Notodontidae. It is found from Texas, south through Central America (including Panama and Costa Rica) to Argentina.

The larvae have been recorded on Hybanthus prunifolius in Panama. Other recorded host plants include Acalypha diversifolia, Chamaedorea, Randia and Meliosma species.

External links
Image
Treefall gaps versus forest understory as environments for a defoliating moth on a tropical forest shrub

Notodontidae of South America